The  or Basque, is a breed of pig native to the Basque Country. As suggested by its name in French, the breed is piebald, black and pink. 

What is today called the Basque pig is one of several historical breeds or breed types kept by Basque peoples, and it was consolidated under the name only in the 1920s. Though they were relatively common in the early 20th century, Basque pigs had nearly disappeared by 1981, with fewer than 100 breeding sows left. 

Today, the breed is preserved by small farmers in France and Spain who are dedicated to traditional Basque foods. Basque pigs grow more slowly and develop more fat than modern breeds like the Large White, making them less well-suited to intensive commercial meat production, but ideal for the creation of cured pork products such as Bayonne ham. Basque sows have smallish litters of about nine young, but have a strong maternal instinct and are good mothers.

References 

Pig breeds
Basque domestic animal breeds